HMS Duchess was a 90-gun second rate ship of the line of the Royal Navy, built by John Shish at Deptford Dockyard, and launched in May 1679.

In 1696, the Duchess was lying in the Thames when passed by famed privateer Capt. William Kidd in the Adventure Galley. Kidd failed to offer the customary salute to the Duchess, and the irate Captain Stewart of the Duchess fired a shot off Kidd's bow, forcing Kidd (surrounded by a "forest of Royal Navy warships") to heave to and be boarded. Stewart then impressed 30 of Kidd's best hand-picked seamen. One of Kidd's influential backers came to his aid, getting Stewart to replace the impressed sailors, but rather than returning Kidd's original crew, he substituted his worst troublemakers.

The Duchess was renamed HMS Princess Anne in 1701, HMS Windsor Castle in 1702, and HMS Blenheim in 1706.

In 1709 Blenheim was rebuilt at Woolwich Dockyard, remaining a 90-gun second rate. She continued to serve until 1763, when she was broken up.

Notes

References

Lavery, Brian (2003) The Ship of the Line - Volume 1: The development of the battlefleet 1650-1850. Conway Maritime Press. .

Ships of the line of the Royal Navy
1670s ships